The ICE Hockey League (International Central European Hockey League, ICEHL), known as the win2day ICE Hockey League for sponsorship reasons, is a Central European hockey league that also serves as the top-tier ice hockey league in Austria, it currently features additional teams from Hungary, Italy, and Slovenia. The league was known as the Erste Bank Eishockey Liga (EBEL) from 2003 until 2020 and as the bet-at-home ICE Hockey League during the 2021–22 season.

Until 2005–06, the league consisted solely of Austrian teams. Since then, the league has added teams from Slovenia (from 2006 to 2017 and from 2021 onwards), Hungary (starting 2007–08), Croatia (from 2009–10 through 2012–13, and again from 2017–18 through 2018–19), the Czech Republic (starting in 2011–12 through 2019–20 and again from 2021-22 onwards), Italy (starting in 2013–14), and Slovakia (starting in 2020–21 through the start of 2021–22).

The non-Austrian teams are competing for the "League Champion" title. Only Austrian teams in this league are additionally eligible for the "Austrian Champion" title. The league has had different sponsors, and the current naming rights have been held by win2day.at since 2022.

Teams from the ICEHL participate in the IIHF's annual Champions Hockey League (CHL), competing for the European Trophy. Participation is based on the strength of the various leagues in Europe (excluding the European/Asian Kontinental Hockey League). Going into the 2022–23 CHL season, the ICEHL was ranked the No. 6 league in Europe, allowing them to send their top three teams to compete in the CHL.

History

Foundation 

The roots of the league go back to 1923 and various Championships, whose winner is officially recognized as the Austrian Champion. There was no Austrian competition between 1939 and 1945. During World War II, a number of Austrian teams competed in the German Ice Hockey Championship, which is why the EK Engelmann Wien and Vienna EV list German Championships in their history.

1965–1990 
The Bundesliga, as it was called, was incepted for the 1965-66 season by EC KAC from Klagenfurt, IEV from Innsbruck, WEVg from Vienna, and KEC from Kitzbühel. EC KAC won the championship 8 times in the 1970s.

When the Austrian national hockey team earned promotion into the Group B of the IIHF, it led to a boom in spectators. Three foreign players were allowed and first signs of financial hiccups came. SV Kapfenberg went bankrupt, and WAT Stadlau abstained from participating in the Bundesliga for financial reasons.

1990–2003 
A first step in internationalization was undertaken as the clubs, in addition to the national championship, participated in the Alpenliga. The Alpenliga was formed with clubs from Italy and Slovenia. After making Ralph Krueger their manager in 1991 VEU Feldkirch won five championships from 1994 to 1998. Rising budgets caused more and more clubs to abstain from participation. In 1997 SV Kapfenberg went bankrupt during the season, and the championship was down to only four clubs. In 2000 VEU Feldkirch went bankrupt. The league was named after its sponsor, Uniqua.

2003–2020 
In 2003 Erste Bank became sponsor and the league was named Erste Bank Eishockey Liga. In 2013–14, Italy's Bolzano Foxes became the first non-Austrian team to win the EBEL title when they beat the Salzburg Red Bulls 3 games to 2 in their best-of-five final series. Such success is not unheard of for an Italian outfit, but previous similar results took place in the Alpenliga and the Cup of the European Leagues, standalone competitions whose postseason tournaments were distinct from the Austrian playoffs. One year after rejoining the league from the Kontinental Hockey League, KHL Medveščak Zagreb once again withdrew from the EBEL, this time citing the difficult economic situation of the club.

2020–present 
In 2020, the league was renamed to ICE Hockey League. "ICE" refers to the league's locale – International Central European – and the surface of an ice hockey rink. At the same time, bet-at-home.com became the title sponsor of the league. From the 2021-22 season onwards the league will expand to 14 teams, with reigning champions Olimpija Ljubljana and Pustertal Wölfe joining from the Alps Hockey League and Orli Znojmo returning after a one-year absence. Austrian online betting platform and casino win2day.at became the league's title sponsor in 2022.

Teams

Playoffs

With their victory in the finals of the 2013–14 season, HC Bolzano became the first non-Austrian team to claim the league title. Formerly the best non-Austrian team result was when HDD Olimpija Ljubljana managed to get into the finals in the 2007–08 season, losing the championship to EC Red Bull Salzburg.

Winter Classics

Austrian Champions 

 1923 Wiener EV
 1924 Wiener EV
 1925 Wiener EV
 1926 Wiener EV
 1927 Wiener EV
 1928 Wiener EV
 1929 Wiener EV
 1930 Wiener EV
 1931 Wiener EV
 1932 Pötzleinsdorfer SK
 1933 Wiener EV
 1934 Klagenfurter
 1935 EC KAC Klagenfurter
 1936 EK Engelmann
 1937 Wiener EV
 1938 EK Engelmann
 1939 Not played due to World War II
 1940 Not played due to World War II
 1941 Not played due to World War II
 1942 Not played due to World War II
 1943 Not played due to World War II
 1944 Not played due to World War II
 1945 Not played due to World War II
 1946 EK Engelmann
 1947 Wiener EV
 1948 Wiener EV
 1949 Wiener EG
 1950 Wiener EG
 1951 Wiener EG
 1952 EC KAC Klagenfurter
 1953 Innsbrucker EV
 1954 Innsbrucker EV
 1955 EC KAC Klagenfurter
 1956 EK Engelmann
 1957 EK Engelmann
 1958 Innsbrucker EV
 1959 Innsbrucker EV
 1960 EC KAC
 1961 Innsbrucker EV
 1962 Wiener EV
 1963 Innsbrucker EV
 1964 EC KAC
 1965 EC KAC
 1966 EC KAC
 1967 EC KAC
 1968 EC KAC
 1969 EC KAC
 1970 EC KAC
 1971 EC KAC
 1972 EC KAC
 1973 EC KAC
 1974 EC KAC
 1975 ATSE Graz
 1976 EC KAC
 1977 EC KAC
 1978 ATSE Graz
 1979 EC KAC
 1980 EC KAC
 1981 Villacher SV
 1982 VEU Feldkirch
 1983 VEU Feldkirch
 1984 VEU Feldkirch
 1985 EC KAC
 1986 EC KAC
 1987 EC KAC
 1988 EC KAC
 1989 GEV Innsbruck
 1990 VEU Feldkirch
 1991 EC KAC
 1992 Villacher SV
 1993 Villacher SV
 1994 VEU Feldkirch
 1995 VEU Feldkirch
 1996 VEU Feldkirch
 1997 VEU Feldkirch
 1998 VEU Feldkirch
 1999 Villacher SV
 2000 EC KAC
 2001 EC KAC
 2002 Villacher SV
 2003 Black Wings Linz
 2004 EC KAC
 2005 Vienna Capitals
 2006 Villacher SV
 2007 Red Bull Salzburg
 2008 Red Bull Salzburg
 2009 EC KAC
 2010 Red Bull Salzburg
 2011 Red Bull Salzburg
 2012 Black Wings Linz
 2013 EC KAC
 2014 Red Bull Salzburg (EBEL title winner HC Bozen–Bolzano)
 2015 Red Bull Salzburg
 2016 Red Bull Salzburg
 2017 Vienna Capitals
 2018 Red Bull Salzburg (EBEL title winner HC Bozen–Bolzano)
 2019 EC KAC
 2020 N/A
 2021 EC KAC
 2022 Red Bull Salzburg

 bold – seasons in which league had teams outside Austria

 [*] – seasons in which the Austrian Champion didn't win the ICEHL title

See also
 Austrian champions (ice hockey)
 Austrian National League, 2nd league in Austria
 Inter-National League
 Alps Hockey League
 Players in the Austrian Hockey League
 Erste Bank Eishockey Liga Playoffs
 Hockey Europe

References

External links

Ice Hockey League Official
Austrian Hockey Association (ÖEHV)
Information about Ice-hockey in Austria (German)

 
Top tier ice hockey leagues in Europe
Professional ice hockey leagues in Austria
Professional ice hockey leagues in Hungary
Professional ice hockey leagues in Italy
Professional ice hockey leagues in the Czech Republic
Professional ice hockey leagues in Slovakia
Multi-national ice hockey leagues in Europe
Multi-national professional sports leagues